is a town located in Miyagi Prefecture, Japan. , the town had an estimated population of 12,100, and a population density of 190 persons per km² in 4794 households.

Geography
Yamamoto is located in south-east Miyagi Prefecture in the Tōhoku region of northern Japan. It is bordered by the Pacific Ocean to the east, and Fukushima Prefecture to the south.

Neighboring municipalities
Miyagi Prefecture
Kakuda
Watari
Marumori
Fukushima Prefecture
Shinchi

Climate
Yamamoto has a humid climate (Köppen climate classification Cfa) characterized by mild summers and cold winters.  The average annual temperature in Yamamoto is 12.6 °C. The average annual rainfall is 1252 mm with September as the wettest month. The temperatures are highest on average in August, at around 24.8 °C, and lowest in January, at around 1.7 °C.

Demographics
Per Japanese census data, the population of Yamamoto peaked at around the year 2000, and has dropped rapidly since.

History
The area of present-day Yamamoto was part of ancient Mutsu Province and was part of the holdings of Sendai Domain under the Edo period Tokugawa shogunate. The village of Yamamoto was established on April 1, 1889, with the establishment of a post-Meiji restoration modern municipalities system. It was raised to town status on February 1, 1951, by merging with the neighboring village of Sakamoto.

Yamamoto was devastated by the 9.0 – 9.1 moment magnitude scale 2011 Tōhoku earthquake off the coast of Japan that occurred at 14:46 JST (05:46 UTC) on 11 March 2011 and resultant  tsunami. Eyewitness accounts describe Yamamoto as "one of the worst-hit areas" with no houses left undamaged. On February 13, 2021, Yamamoto was devastated by a M 7.3 earthquake that struck off the coast of Fukushima prefecture, with a Shindo 7 rating.

Government
Yamamoto has a mayor-council form of government with a directly elected mayor and a unicameral town council of 13 members. Yamamoto and the town of Watari together contribute two seats to the Miyagi Prefectural legislature. In terms of national politics, the town is part of Miyagi 3rd district of the lower house of the Diet of Japan.

Economy
The economy of Yamamoto is largely based on agriculture and commercial fishing.

Education
Yamamoto has four public elementary schools and two public middle schools operated by the town government. The town does not have a public high school; however, there is a special education school for the handicapped operated by the Miyagi Prefectural Board of Education.

Transportation

Railway
 East Japan Railway Company (JR East) - Jōban Line
  -

Highway

Noted people from Yamamoto
Makoto Kosaka, professional baseball player
Keita Saito, professional football player

References

External links

Official Website 

 
Towns in Miyagi Prefecture
Populated coastal places in Japan